Acacia sorophylla is a shrub of the genus Acacia and the subgenus Phyllodineae that is endemic to a small area of south western Australia

Description
It has glabrous terminal branches that often arch downwards. Like most species of Acacia it has phyllodes rather than true leaves. They form in budles or cluster and are crowded on to short knotty branchlets. It blooms from October to December and produces yellow flowers.

Distribution
It is native to a small area along the south coast in the Goldfields-Esperance region of Western Australia just inland from Esperance where it is commonly situated on hilltops, limestone rises, plains and along the edges of salt lakes growing in sandy or clay or calcareous loamy soils. The bulk of the population is found between Scaddan in the west to around Mount Ragged in the Cape Arid National Park to the east usually as a part of shrub mallee or low Eucalyptus woodland communities.

See also
List of Acacia species

References

sorophylla
Acacias of Western Australia
Taxa named by Ernst Pritzel
Plants described in 1904